The 2018 Pacific typhoon season was formerly the costliest Pacific typhoon season on record before being surpassed the following year. The season had no official boundaries, and storms can form year-round, as evidenced by the formation of Tropical Storm Bolaven in late December 2017, and Tropical Storm Pabuk on December 31, 2018. Despite this, activity usually peaks between May and November. The season featured above-average activity, with 29 named storms, 13 typhoons, and 7 super typhoons forming in the West Pacific.

The Japan Meteorological Agency (JMA) is the official Regional Specialized Meteorological Centre for the Western Pacific Basin. As such, it is responsible for assigning names to all tropical cyclones that reach 10-minute maximum sustained winds of at least  in the region. The PAGASA assigns names to tropical cyclones that form or enter their area of responsibility as a tropical depression or stronger, regardless if the cyclone has been assigned a name by the JMA. The Joint Typhoon Warning Center (JTWC) also monitors systems in the Western Pacific Basin, assigning systems a number with a "W" suffix if the system is a tropical depression or stronger.

Timeline

January

January 1
08:00 UTC at  the PAGASA upgrades a low-pressure area to a tropical depression, assigning it the local name Agaton.
12:00 UTC at  the JTWC begins tracking the tropical depression, designating it 01W.
17:00 UTC 01W makes its first landfall on Socorro, Surigao del Norte.
17:15 UTC 01W makes its second landfall on Claver, Surigao del Norte.
20:00 UTC 01W makes its third landfall on Jagna, Bohol.
21:00 UTC 01W makes its fourth landfall on Santander, Cebu.
23:30 UTC 01W makes its fifth landfall on Bais, Negros Oriental.
January 2
02:45 UTC 01W makes its sixth and final landfall on Aborlan.
January 3
00:00 UTC at  the JMA upgrades 01W to a tropical storm, assigning it the name Bolaven, estimating it has peaked in intensity with maximum sustained winds of 65 km/h (40 mph) and a minimum central pressure of 1002 hPa (mbar, 29.59 inHg).
00:00 UTC at  the JTWC upgrades Bolaven to a tropical storm.
03:00 UTC Bolaven exits the PAR.
12:00 UTC at  the JTWC downgrades Bolaven to a tropical depression.
January 4
00:00 UTC at  the JMA downgrades Bolaven to a tropical depression.
06:00 UTC at  the JTWC downgrades Bolaven to a tropical disturbance.
12:00 UTC Bolaven dissipates east of Vietnam.

February
February 8
00:00 UTC at  the JMA assesses that a tropical depression has formed near Chuuk State.
February 10
12:00 UTC at  the JTWC assesses that a tropical wave developed into a tropical depression, designating it 02W.
February 11
00:00 UTC at  the JTWC upgrades 02W to a tropical storm.
06:00 UTC at  the JMA upgrades 02W to a tropical storm east of the Palau islands, assigning it the name Sanba, assessing it has peaked in intensity with maximum sustained winds of 65 km/h (40 mph) and a minimum central pressure of 1000 hPa (mbar; 29.59 inHg).
12:00 UTC at  the JTWC assess that Sanba has peaked in intensity, with 1-minute winds of 75 km/h (45 mph).
14:00 UTC at  Sanba enters the PAR, prompting the PAGASA to assign it the local name Basyang.
February 13
01:15 UTC Sanba makes its first landfall on Cortes, Surigao del Sur.
06:00 UTC at  the JMA downgrades Sanba to a tropical depression over the Bohol Sea.
06:00 UTC at  the JTWC downgrades Sanba to a tropical depression.
13:00 UTC Sanba makes its second and final landfall on Dumaguete.
18:00 UTC at  the JTWC downgrades Sanba to a tropical wave.
February 14
18:00 UTC at  the JTWC assessed that Sanba re-strengthened into a tropical depression.
February 15
00:00 UTC at  the JTWC downgrades Sanba into a tropical disturbance.
February 16
12:00 UTC Sanba dissipates over the South China Sea.

March
March 24
18:00 UTC at  the JMA begins tracking a tropical depression near the Caroline Islands.
March 25
00:00 UTC at  the JTWC begins tracking the Caroline Islands tropical depression, designating it 03W.
06:00 UTC at  the JMA upgrades 03W to a tropical storm, assigning it the name Jelawat.
March 27
00:00 UTC Jelawat enters the PAR, prompting the PAGASA to assign it the local name Caloy.
12:00 UTC Jelawat exits the PAR.
18:00 UTC at  the JTWC upgrades Jelawat to a tropical storm.
March 28
06:00 UTC at  the JMA upgrades Jelawat to a severe tropical storm.
March 29
00:00 UTC at  the JMA upgrades Jelawat to a typhoon.
18:00 UTC at  the JTWC upgrades Jelawat to a typhoon.
March 30
00:00 UTC at  the JTWC upgrades Jelawat to a Category 2-equivalent typhoon on the Saffir–Simpson scale (SSHWS).
06:00 UTC at  the JMA estimates that Jelawat has peaked in intensity with maximum sustained winds of 195 km/h (120 mph) and a minimum central pressure of 915 hPa (mbar; 27.02 inHg).
06:00 UTC at  the JTWC upgrades Jelawat to a Category 4-equivalent typhoon on the SSHWS.
12:00 UTC at  the JTWC upgrades Jelawat to a super typhoon, estimating maximum 1-minute sustained winds of 240 km/h (150 mph).
18:00 UTC at  the JTWC downgrades Jelawat to a typhoon.
March 31
00:00 UTC at  the JTWC downgrades Jelawat to a Category 3-equivalent typhoon on the SSHWS.
06:00 UTC at  the JTWC downgrades Jelawat to a Category 1-equivalent typhoon on the SSHWS.
12:00 UTC at  the JTWC downgrades Jelawat to a tropical storm.
18:00 UTC at  the JMA downgrades Jelawat to a tropical storm.

April
April 1
00:00 UTC at  the JMA downgrades Jelawat to a tropical depression.
06:00 UTC at  the JTWC reclassifies Jelawat to a subtropical storm.
12:00 UTC Jelawat dissipates.

May
May 10
18:00 UTC at  the JMA begins tracking a tropical depression.
18:00 UTC at  the JTWC begins tracking the tropical depression, designating it 04W.
May 12
12:00 UTC at  the JTWC upgrades 04W to a tropical storm, estimating maximum 1-minute sustained winds of 65 km/h (40 mph).
18:00 UTC at  the JMA estimates that 04W has peaked in intensity with maximum sustained winds of 55 km/h (35 mph) and a minimum central pressure of 1008 hPa (mbar; 29.77 inHg).
May 13
06:00 UTC at  the JTWC downgrades 04W to a tropical depression.
May 14
06:00 UTC at  the JTWC downgrades 04W to a tropical disturbance.
May 15
00:00 UTC at  the JMA issues its final warning on 04W.

June
June 2
12:00 UTC at  the JTWC begins tracking a tropical depression, designating it 05W.
18:00 UTC at  the JMA begins tracking 05W, estimating that it has developed into a tropical depression.
June 3
18:00 UTC at  the JMA begins tracking a tropical depression in the Philippine Sea.
June 4
06:00 UTC at  the JMA begins tracking a tropical depression northeast of Yap, estimating a minimum central pressure of 1006 hPa (mbar; 29.71 inHg).
June 5
00:00 UTC at  the JMA upgrades 05W to a tropical storm, assigning it the name Ewiniar.
14:00 UTC at  the Yap depression is absorbed into the Philippine Sea depression.
18:00 UTC at  the JTWC upgrades Ewiniar to a tropical storm.
22:25 UTC Ewiniar makes its first landfall on Xuwen County.
June 6
06:50 UTC Ewiniar makes its second landfall on Haikou.
12:00 UTC at  the JTWC downgrades Ewiniar to a tropical depression.
June 7
00:00 UTC at  the JTWC upgrades Ewiniar to a tropical storm.
06:00 UTC at  the JMA estimates that Ewiniar has peaked in intensity with maximum sustained winds of 75 km/h (45 mph) and a minimum central pressure of 998 hPa (mbar; 29.47 inHg).
12:00 UTC at  the JTWC begins tracking the Philippine Sea tropical depression, designating it 06W.
12:30 UTC Ewiniar makes its third and final landfall on Yangjiang.
18:00 UTC at  the JMA upgrades 06W to a tropical storm, assigning it the name Maliksi.
18:00 UTC at  the JTWC upgrades Maliksi to a tropical storm.
June 8
00:00 UTC at  the JTWC downgrades Ewiniar to a tropical depression.
12:00 UTC at  the JTWC downgrades Ewiniar to a tropical disturbance.
18:00 UTC at  the JMA downgrades Ewiniar to a tropical depression.
June 9
06:00 UTC at  the JMA upgrades Maliksi to a severe tropical storm.
21:00 UTC at  Maliksi exits the PAR.
June 10
00:00 UTC at  the JMA estimates that Maliksi has peaked in intensity with maximum sustained winds of 110 km/h (70 mph) and a minimum central pressure of 970 hPa (mbar; 28.64 inHg).
June 11
12:00 UTC Ewiniar dissipates near Miyako-jima.
12:00 UTC at  the JTWC assesses that Maliksi has transitioned into an extratropical cyclone.
18:00 UTC at  the JMA assesses that Maliksi has transitioned into an extratropical cyclone.
June 13
00:00 UTC Maliksi dissipates far to the east of Japan.
00:00 UTC at  the JTWC begins tracking a subtropical depression, designating it 07W.
June 14
00:00 UTC at  the JTWC upgrades 07W to a subtropical storm, estimating maximum 1-minute sustained winds of 65 km/h (40 mph).
06:00 UTC at  the JTWC assesses that 07W has transitioned into an extratropical cyclone.
06:00 UTC at  the JTWC begins tracking a tropical depression, designating it 08W.
12:00 UTC at  the JMA begins tracking 08W, estimating that it has developed into a tropical depression.
14:00 UTC the South China Sea tropical depression enters the PAR, prompting the PAGASA to assign it the name Ester.
18:00 UTC at  the JTWC upgrades 08W to a tropical storm.
June 15
00:00 UTC at  the JMA upgrades 08W to a tropical storm, assigning it the name Gaemi.
00:00 UTC at  the JTWC downgrades Gaemi to a tropical depression.
00:00 UTC at  Gaemi makes landfall north of Kaohsiung.
06:00 UTC at  the JTWC upgrades Gaemi to a tropical storm.
15:00 UTC Gaemi exits the PAR.
18:00 UTC at  the JTWC reclassifies Gaemi to a subtropical storm.
June 16
06:00 UTC at  the JMA estimates that Gaemi has peaked in intensity with maximum sustained winds of 85 km/h (50 mph) and a minimum central pressure of 990 hPa (mbar; 29.23 inHg).
12:00 UTC at  the JTWC assesses that Gaemi has transitioned into an extratropical cyclone.
June 17
00:00 UTC at  the JMA assesses that Gaemi has transitioned into an extratropical cyclone.
06:00 UTC at  the JMA begins tracking a tropical depression in the South China Sea.
June 18
06:00 UTC the South China Sea tropical depression dissipates.
June 21
18:00 UTC Gaemi dissipates.
June 28
00:00 UTC at  the JMA begins tracking a tropical depression over the Philippine Sea.
12:00 UTC at  the JTWC begins tracking the Philippine Sea tropical depression, designating it 09W.
21:00 UTC at  the PAGASA gives 09W the local name Florita.
June 29
00:00 UTC at  the JMA upgrades 09W to a tropical storm, assigning it the name Prapiroon.
00:00 UTC at  the JTWC upgrades Prapiroon to a tropical storm.

July
July 1
00:00 UTC at  the JMA upgrades Prapiroon to a severe tropical storm.
06:00 UTC at  Prapiroon exits the PAR.
18:00 UTC at  the JTWC upgrades Prapiroon to a typhoon.
July 2
00:00 UTC at  the JMA upgrades Prapiroon to a typhoon.
18:00 UTC at  the JMA estimates that Prapiroon has peaked in intensity with maximum sustained winds of 120 km/h (75 mph) and a minimum central pressure of 960 hPa (mbar; 28.35 inHg).
18:00 UTC at  the JTWC estimates that Prapiroon has peaked in intensity with maximum 1-minute sustained winds of 150 km/h (90 mph).
July 3
00:00 UTC at  the JMA downgrades Prapiroon to a severe tropical storm.
00:00 UTC at  the JMA begins tracking a tropical depression near the Mariana Islands.
12:00 UTC at  the JTWC downgrades Prapiroon to a tropical storm.
12:00 UTC at  the JTWC begins tracking the Mariana Islands tropical depression, designating it 10W.
July 4
00:00 UTC at  the JMA downgrades Prapiroon to a tropical storm.
00:00 UTC at  the JTWC upgrades 10W to a tropical storm.
06:00 UTC at  the JMA assesses that Prapiroon has transitioned into an extratropical cyclone.
06:00 UTC at  the JTWC assesses that Prapiroon has transitioned into an extratropical cyclone.
12:00 UTC at  the JMA upgrades 10W to a tropical storm, assigning it the name Maria.
July 5
00:00 UTC at  the JMA upgrades Maria to a severe tropical storm.
06:00 UTC at  the JTWC upgrades Maria to a typhoon.
12:00 UTC Prapiroon dissipates near northern Japan.
12:00 UTC at  the JMA upgrades Maria to a typhoon.
12:00 UTC at  the JTWC upgrades Maria to a Category 2-equivalent typhoon on the SSHWS.
18:00 UTC at  the JTWC upgrades Maria to a Category 4-equivalent typhoon on the SSHWS.
July 6
00:00 UTC at  the JTWC upgrades Maria to a super typhoon.
12:00 UTC at  the JMA estimates that Maria has reached an initial peak intensity of 185 km/h (115 mph) and a pressure of 925 hPa (mbar; 27.32 inHg).
18:00 UTC at  the JTWC downgrades Maria to a typhoon.
July 8
00:00 UTC at  the JTWC upgrades Maria to a super typhoon.
06:00 UTC at  the JTWC upgrades Maria to a Category 5-equivalent typhoon on the SSHWS.
12:00 UTC at  the JTWC estimates that Maria has peaked in intensity with maximum 1-minute sustained winds of 270 km/h (165 mph).
21:00 UTC  the PAGASA assigns Maria the local name Gardo as it entered the PAR.
July 9
00:00 UTC at  the JMA estimates that Maria has peaked in intensity with maximum sustained winds of 195 km/h (120 mph) and a minimum central pressure of 915 hPa (mbar; 27.02 inHg).
06:00 UTC at  the JTWC downgrades Maria to a Category 4-equivalent typhoon on the SSHWS.
12:00 UTC at  the JTWC downgrades Maria to a typhoon.
July 10
00:00 UTC at  the JTWC downgrades Maria to a Category 3-equivalent typhoon on the SSHWS.
10:00 UTC Maria exits the PAR.
12:00 UTC at  the JTWC downgrades Maria to a Category 2-equivalent typhoon on the SSHWS.
July 11
01:10 UTC Maria makes landfall on Lianjiang County.
06:00 UTC at  the JTWC downgrades Maria to a Category 1-equivalent typhoon on the SSHWS.
12:00 UTC at  the JMA downgrades Maria to a tropical storm.
12:00 UTC at  the JTWC downgrades Maria to a tropical storm.
18:00 UTC at  the JMA downgrades Maria to a tropical depression.
18:00 UTC at  the JMA downgrades Maria to a tropical depression.
July 13
00:00 UTC Maria dissipates over Central China.
July 14
00:00 UTC at  the JTWC upgrades a tropical disturbance to a tropical depression over the Philippine Sea, designating it 11W.
July 15
15:00 UTC at  the PAGASA assigns the local name Henry to 11W.
July 16
00:00 UTC at  the JMA begins tracking 11W, estimating that it has developed into a tropical depression.
00:00 UTC at  the JMA begins tracking a tropical depression in the Gulf of Tonkin.
12:00 UTC at  the JTWC upgrades 11W to a tropical storm.
11W made 3 landfalls on Camiguin de Babuyanes, Fuga Island, and Dalupiri Island.

July 17
00:00 UTC at  the JMA upgrades 11W to a tropical storm, assigning it the name Son-Tinh.
00:00 UTC at  Son-Tinh exits the PAR.
12:00 UTC at  the JMA estimates that Son-Tinh has peaked in intensity for the first time with maximum sustained winds of 75 km/h (45 mph) and a minimum central pressure of 994 hPa (mbar; 29.35 inHg).
12:00 UTC at  the JMA begins tracking a tropical depression in the Philippine Sea.
12:00 UTC the JMA stops tracking the Gulf of Tonkin tropical depression.
20:50 UTC Son-Tinh made a fourth landfall on Hainan.
July 18
03:00 UTC at  the PAGASA assigns the Philippine Sea depression the local name Inday.
06:00 UTC at  the JMA estimates that Son-Tinh has peaked in intensity for the second time.
12:00 UTC at  the JTWC estimates that Son-Tinh has peaked in intensity with maximum 1-minute sustained winds of 90 km/h (60 mph).
12:00 UTC at  the JMA upgrades the Philippine Sea tropical depression to a tropical storm, assigning it the name Ampil.
Son-Tinh made a fifth landfall on Hà Tĩnh Province.

July 19
00:00 UTC at  the JMA downgrades Son-Tinh to a tropical depression.
06:00 UTC at  the JTWC upgrades Ampil to a tropical storm.
12:00 UTC at  the JTWC downgrades Son-Tinh to a tropical depression.
18:00 UTC at  the JMA upgrades Ampil to a severe tropical storm, assessing it has peaked in intensity with maximum sustained winds of 90 km/h (60 mph) and a minimum central pressure of 985 hPa (mbar; 29.09 inHg).
July 20
00:00 UTC at  the JTWC downgrades Son-Tinh to a tropical disturbance.
06:00 UTC at  the JMA begins tracking a tropical depression in the South China Sea.
12:00 UTC at  the JTWC begins tracking the tropical depression, designating it 13W.
18:00 UTC at  Ampil exits the PAR.
July 21
00:00 UTC at  Ampil makes landfall on Okinawa.
00:00 UTC at  the JTWC upgrades 13W to a tropical storm.
03:00 UTC at  the PAGASA assigns the local name Josie to 13W.
06:00 UTC at  the JTWC upgrades Son-Tinh to a tropical depression.
06:00 UTC at  the JMA estimates that 13W has peaked with maximum sustained winds of 55 km/h (35 mph) and a minimum central pressure of 996 hPa (mbar; 29.42 inHg).
12:00 UTC at  the JTWC estimates that 13W has peaked with maximum 1-minute sustained winds of 65 km/h (40 mph).
18:00 UTC at  the JTWC upgrades Son-Tinh to a tropical storm.
18:00 UTC at  the JTWC downgrades 13W to a tropical depression.
July 22
00:00 UTC at  the JMA downgrades Ampil to a tropical storm.
00:00 UTC at  the JTWC estimates that Ampil has peaked with maximum 1-minute sustained winds of 100 km/h (65 mph).
00:00 UTC at  the JTWC downgrades 13W to a low-pressure area.
00:00 UTC at  the JMA begins tracking a tropical depression near Minami-Tori-shima.
00:00 UTC at  the JTWC begins tracking the tropical depression, designating it 14W.
04:30 UTC Ampil makes landfall on Chongming Island.
18:00 UTC at  the JTWC upgrades 14W to a tropical storm.
21:00 UTC at  13W exits the PAR.
Son-Tinh made a sixth landfall on Hainan.

July 23
06:00 UTC at  the JTWC downgrades Son-Tinh to a tropical depression.
06:00 UTC at  the JTWC downgrades Ampil to a tropical depression.
12:00 UTC at  the JMA downgrades Ampil to a tropical depression.
12:00 UTC at  the JMA issues its final warning on 13W.
12:00 UTC at  the JMA upgrades 14W to a tropical storm, assigning it the name Wukong.
18:00 UTC 13W dissipates.
18:00 UTC at  the JMA begins tracking a tropical depression.
18:00 UTC at  the JTWC begins tracking the tropical depression, designating it 15W.
Son-Tinh made a seventh and eighth landfall on the Leizhou Peninsula.

July 24
06:00 UTC at  the JTWC downgrades Son-Tinh to a tropical disturbance.
06:00 UTC at  the JTWC upgrades 15W to a tropical storm.
12:00 UTC at  the JMA upgrades 15W to a tropical storm, assigning it the name Jongdari.
July 25
00:00 UTC Son-Tinh dissipates over South China.
00:00 UTC at  the JMA assesses that Ampil has transitioned into an extratropical cyclone.
00:00 UTC at  the JMA upgrades Wukong to a severe tropical storm, assessing it has peaked in intensity with maximum sustained winds of 95 km/h (60 mph) and a minimum central pressure of 990 hPa (mbar; 29.23 inHg).
06:00 UTC at  the JTWC upgrades Wukong to a typhoon, assessing it has peaked in intensity with maximum 1-minute sustained winds of 120 km/h (75 mph).
12:00 UTC at  the JTWC downgrades Wukong to a tropical storm.
12:00 UTC at  the JMA upgrades Jongdari to a severe tropical storm.
18:00 UTC at  the JMA downgrades Wukong to a tropical storm.
July 26
12:00 UTC Ampil dissipates over Primorsky Krai.
12:00 UTC at  the JTWC upgrades Jongdari to a typhoon.
18:00 UTC at  the JTWC downgrades Wukong to a tropical depression.
18:00 UTC at  the JMA upgrades Jongdari to a typhoon.
July 27
00:00 UTC at  the JMA assesses that Wukong has transitioned into an extratropical cyclone near the Kuril Islands.
00:00 UTC at  the JTWC downgrades Wukong to a tropical disturbance.
00:00 UTC at  the JMA estimates that Jongdari has peaked in intensity with maximum sustained winds of 140 km/h (85 mph) and a minimum central pressure of 960 hPa (mbar; 28.35 inHg).
00:00 UTC at  the JTWC upgrades Jongdari to a Category 2-equivalent typhoon on the SSHWS.
06:00 UTC at  the JTWC assesses that Wukong has transitioned into an extratropical cyclone.
06:00 UTC at  the JTWC estimates that Jongdari has peaked in intensity with maximum 1-minute sustained winds of 165 km/h (105 mph).
18:00 UTC Wukong dissipates.
July 28
06:00 UTC at  the JTWC downgrades Jongdari to a Category 1-equivalent typhoon on the SSHWS.
16:00 UTC Jongdari makes its first landfall on Ise, Mie.
18:00 UTC at  the JMA downgrades Jongdari to a severe tropical storm.
18:00 UTC at  the JTWC downgrades Jongdari to a tropical storm.
July 29
00:00 UTC at  the JMA downgrades Jongdari to a tropical storm.
08:30 UTC Jongdari makes its second landfall on Buzen, Fukuoka.
12:00 UTC at  the JTWC downgrades Jongdari to a tropical depression.
July 30
06:00 UTC at  the JTWC upgrades a tropical disturbance to a tropical depression, designating it 16W.
12:00 UTC at  the JMA downgrades Jongdari to a tropical depression.
July 31
00:00 UTC at  the JMA upgrades Jongdari to a tropical storm.
00:00 UTC at  the JTWC upgrades Jongdari to a tropical storm.
00:00 UTC at  the JMA begins tracking Tropical Depression 16W.

August
August 1
00:00 UTC at  the JTWC downgrades Jongdari to a tropical depression.
06:00 UTC at  the JMA estimates that 16W has peaked in intensity with maximum sustained winds of 55 km/h (35 mph) and a minimum central pressure of 1000 hPa (mbar; 29.53 inHg).
06:00 UTC at  the JTWC reclassifies 16W to a subtropical depression.
12:00 UTC at  the JTWC upgrades 16W to a subtropical storm.
August 2
00:00 UTC at  the JTWC stops tracking 16W.
06:00 UTC at  the JTWC upgrades Jongdari to a tropical storm.
06:00 UTC at  the JMA stops tracking 16W.
06:00 UTC at  the JMA begins tracking a tropical depression southwest of Minami-Tori-shima.
12:00 UTC at  the JTWC downgrades Jongdari to a tropical depression.
18:00 UTC at  the JTWC upgrades the Minami-Tori-shima system to a tropical depression, designating it 17W.
August 3
00:00 UTC at  the JMA downgrades Jongdari to a tropical depression.
00:00 UTC at  the JMA upgrades 17W to a tropical storm, assigning it the name Shanshan.
02:30 UTC Jongdari makes its third and final landfall on Jinshan District.
06:00 UTC at  the JTWC upgrades Shanshan to a tropical storm.
12:00 UTC at  the JTWC downgrades Jongdari to a tropical disturbance.
12:00 UTC at  the JMA upgrades Shanshan to a severe tropical storm.
18:00 UTC at  the JTWC upgrades a tropical disturbance near the International Date Line to a subtropical depression.
August 4
00:00 UTC at  the JTWC upgrades the subtropical depression to a subtropical storm, estimating maximum 1-minute sustained winds of 65 km/h (40 mph).
06:00 UTC at  the JMA upgrades Shanshan to a typhoon.
06:00 UTC at  the JTWC upgrades Shanshan to a typhoon.
18:00 UTC Jongdari dissipates over Central China.
18:00 UTC at  the JMA estimates that Shanshan has peaked in intensity with maximum sustained winds of 130 km/h (80 mph) and a minimum central pressure of 970 hPa (mbar; 28.64 inHg).
August 5
06:00 UTC at  the JTWC assesses that the subtropical storm has transitioned to an extratropical cyclone.
12:00 UTC at  the JTWC stops tracking the system.
August 6
00:00 UTC at  the JMA begins tracking a tropical depression in the Philippine Sea.
12:00 UTC at  the JTWC begins tracking the system, designating it 18W.
August 7
00:00 UTC the PAGASA upgrades 18W to a tropical depression, assigning it the local name Karding.
06:00 UTC at  the JTWC upgrades Shanshan to a Category 2-equivalent typhoon on the SSHWS, estimating maximum 1-minute sustained winds of 155 km/h (100 mph).
12:00 UTC at  the JTWC downgrades Shanshan to a Category 1-equivalent typhoon on the SSHWS.
August 8
00:00 UTC at  the JMA upgrades 18W to a tropical storm, assigning it the name Yagi.
00:00 UTC at  the JTWC upgrades Yagi to a tropical storm.
18:00 UTC at  the JTWC downgrades Shanshan to a tropical storm.
August 9
00:00 UTC at  the JMA downgrades Shanshan to a severe tropical storm just east of the Ibaraki Prefecture.
18:00 UTC at  the JMA downgrades Shanshan to a tropical storm.
18:00 UTC at  the JMA begins tracking a tropical depression east of Hainan.
August 10
00:00 UTC at  the JTWC downgrades Shanshan to a tropical depression.
06:00 UTC at  the JMA assesses that Shanshan has transitioned into an extratropical cyclone.
06:00 UTC at  the JTWC assesses that Shanshan has transitioned into an extratropical cyclone.
12:00 UTC at  the JMA begins tracking a tropical depression to the west of the Mariana Islands.
12:00 UTC at  the JTWC begins tracking the Mariana Islands tropical depression, designating it 19W.
August 11
00:00 UTC at  the JTWC upgrades 19W to a tropical storm.
01:00 UTC Yagi exits the PAR.
02:35 UTC the Hainan tropical depression makes its first landfall on Hailing Island, Yangjiang.
12:00 UTC Shanshan dissipates.
12:00 UTC at  the JMA estimates that Yagi has peaked in intensity with maximum sustained winds of 75 km/h (45 mph) and a minimum central pressure of 990 hPa (mbar; 29.23 inHg).
12:00 UTC at  the JTWC begins tracking the Hainan tropical depression, designating it 20W.
12:00 UTC at  the JMA upgrades 19W to a tropical storm, assigning it the name Leepi.
August 12
12:00 UTC at  the JTWC estimates that Yagi has peaked in intensity with maximum 1-minute sustained winds of 85 km/h (50 mph).
12:00 UTC at  the JTWC upgrades 20W to a tropical storm.
12:00 UTC at  the JTWC upgrades Leepi to a typhoon.
15:35 UTC Yagi makes landfall on Wenling.
18:00 UTC at  the JTWC estimates that Leepi has peaked in intensity with maximum 1-minute sustained winds of 120 km/h (75 mph).
August 13
00:00 UTC at  the JMA downgrades Yagi to a tropical depression.
00:00 UTC at  the JTWC downgrades Yagi to a tropical depression.
00:00 UTC at  the JMA upgrades 20W to a tropical storm, assigning it the name Bebinca.
06:00 UTC at  the JMA upgrades Leepi to a severe tropical storm, estimating maximum sustained winds of 95 km/h (60 mph) and a minimum central pressure of 994 hPa (mbar; 29.35 inHg).
18:00 UTC at  Hurricane Hector crosses into the West Pacific basin as a tropical storm.
August 14
00:00 UTC at  the JMA begins tracking a tropical depression south of Okinawa.
06:00 UTC at  the JTWC assesses that Yagi has transitioned into an extratropical cyclone.
06:00 UTC at  the JTWC downgrades Hector to a tropical depression.
15:00 UTC at  the JMA downgrades Leepi to a tropical storm.
17:30 UTC Leepi makes landfall on Hyūga, Miyazaki.
18:00 UTC at  the JTWC upgrades Hector to a tropical storm.
18:00 UTC at  the JTWC begins tracking the Okinawa tropical depression, designating it 21W.
August 15
00:00 UTC at  the JMA downgrades Leepi to a tropical depression.
00:00 UTC at  the JTWC reclassifies Hector to a subtropical storm.
06:00 UTC at  the JMA assesses that Yagi has transitioned into an extratropical cyclone over the Bohai Sea.
06:00 UTC at  the JTWC downgrades Leepi to a tropical depression.
06:00 UTC at  the JMA upgrades 21W to a tropical storm, assigning it the name Rumbia.
06:00 UTC at  the JMA begins tracking a tropical depression south of Guam.
12:00 UTC at  the JTWC assesses that Leepi has transitioned into a post-tropical cyclone.
12:00 UTC at  the JMA downgrades Hector to a tropical depression north of Wake Island.
12:00 UTC at  the JTWC downgrades Hector to a subtropical depression.
12:00 UTC at  the JTWC upgrades Rumbia to a tropical storm.
12:00 UTC at  the JTWC begins tracking the Guam tropical depression, designating it 22W.
13:40 UTC Bebinca makes its second landfall on Leizhou.
18:00 UTC Leepi dissipates over the Sea of Japan.
August 16
00:00 UTC at  the JMA upgrades 22W to a tropical storm, assigning it the name Soulik.
00:00 UTC at  the JTWC upgrades Soulik to a tropical storm.
06:00 UTC Yagi dissipates over northern China.
06:00 UTC at  the JMA estimates that Bebinca has peaked in intensity with maximum sustained winds of 85 km/h (50 mph) and a minimum central pressure of 985 hPa (mbar; 29.09 inHg).
06:00 UTC at  the JTWC estimates that Bebinca has peaked in intensity with maximum 1-minute sustained winds of 110 km/h (70 mph).
06:00 UTC at  the JTWC downgrades Hector to a tropical disturbance.
12:00 UTC at  the JMA estimates that Rumbia has peaked in intensity with maximum sustained winds of 85 km/h (50 mph) and a minimum central pressure of 985 hPa (mbar; 29.09 inHg).
12:00 UTC at  the JMA begins tracking a tropical depression near the Marshall Islands.
18:00 UTC at  the JTWC estimates that Rumbia has peaked in intensity with maximum 1-minute sustained winds of 95 km/h (60 mph).
20:05 UTC Rumbia makes landfall on Pudong.
22:30 UTC Bebinca makes its third and final landfall on Nghi Sơn.
August 17
00:00 UTC Hector dissipates.
00:00 UTC at  the JMA upgrades Soulik to a severe tropical storm.
00:00 UTC at  the JTWC upgrades Soulik to a typhoon.
06:00 UTC at  the JMA downgrades Bebinca to a tropical depression.
06:00 UTC at  the JTWC downgrades Bebinca to a tropical depression.
06:00 UTC at  the JTWC begins tracking the Marshall Islands tropical depression, designating it 23W.
12:00 UTC at  the JMA upgrades Soulik to a typhoon.
18:00 UTC at  the JTWC downgrades Bebinca to a tropical disturbance.
18:00 UTC at  the JTWC downgrades Rumbia to a tropical depression.
18:00 UTC at  the JTWC upgrades Soulik to a Category 2-equivalent typhoon on the SSHWS.
August 18
00:00 UTC Bebinca dissipates over Laos.
00:00 UTC at  the JMA downgrades Rumbia to a tropical depression.
06:00 UTC at  the JTWC downgrades Rumbia to a tropical disturbance.
06:00 UTC at  the JTWC upgrades Soulik to a Category 3-equivalent typhoon on the SSHWS.
06:00 UTC at  the JTWC upgrades 23W to a tropical storm.
12:00 UTC at  the JTWC downgrades Soulik to a Category 2-equivalent typhoon on the SSHWS.
12:00 UTC at  the JMA upgrades 23W to a tropical storm, assigning it the name Cimaron.
August 19
12:00 UTC at  the JTWC downgrades Soulik to a Category 1-equivalent typhoon on the SSHWS.
12:00 UTC at  the JMA upgrades Cimaron to a severe tropical storm.
18:00 UTC Rumbia dissipates south of the Yellow River.
18:00 UTC at  the JTWC upgrades Soulik to a Category 2-equivalent typhoon on the SSHWS.
August 20
06:00 UTC at  the JTWC upgrades Soulik to a Category 3-equivalent typhoon on the SSHWS.
06:00 UTC at  the JTWC upgrades Cimaron to a typhoon.
18:00 UTC at  the JMA estimates that Soulik has peaked in intensity with maximum sustained winds of 155 km/h (100  mph) and a minimum central pressure of 950 hPa (mbar; 28.05 inHg).
18:00 UTC at  the JTWC estimates that Soulik has peaked in intensity with maximum 1-minute sustained winds of 205 km/h (125 mph).
August 21
00:00 UTC at  the JMA upgrades Cimaron to a typhoon.
06:00 UTC at  the JTWC downgrades Soulik to a Category 2-equivalent typhoon on the SSHWS.
06:00 UTC at  the JTWC upgrades Cimaron to a Category 2-equivalent typhoon on the SSHWS.
18:00 UTC at  the JTWC upgrades Cimaron to a Category 3-equivalent typhoon on the SSHWS.
August 22
00:00 UTC at  the JTWC upgrades Cimaron to a Category 4-equivalent typhoon on the SSHWS, estimating maximum 1-minute sustained winds of 215 km/h (130 mph).
00:00 UTC at  the JMA begins tracking a tropical depression in the South China Sea.
06:00 UTC at  the JMA estimates that Cimaron has peaked in intensity with maximum sustained winds of 155 km/h (100 mph) and a minimum central pressure of 950 hPa (mbar; 28.05 inHg).
06:00 UTC at  the JTWC downgrades Cimaron to a Category 3-equivalent typhoon on the SSHWS.
12:00 UTC at  the JTWC downgrades Soulik to a Category 1-equivalent typhoon on the SSHWS.
18:00 UTC at  the JTWC downgrades Cimaron to a Category 2-equivalent typhoon on the SSHWS.
18:00 UTC at  the JTWC beings tracking the South China Sea tropical depression, designating it 24W.
21:00 UTC 24W enters the PAR, prompting the PAGASA to assign it the local name Luis.
August 23
00:00 UTC at  the JTWC downgrades Cimaron to a Category 1-equivalent typhoon on the SSHWS.
00:00 UTC at  the JMA estimates that 24W has peaked in intensity with maximum sustained winds of 55 km/h (35 mph) and a minimum central pressure of 994 hPa (mbar; 29.35 inHg).
00:00 UTC 24W makes landfall on Kaohsiung.
06:00 UTC at  the JTWC downgrades Soulik to a tropical storm.
12:00 UTC at  the JMA downgrades Soulik to a severe tropical storm.
14:00 UTC Soulik makes landfall on Haenam County.
16:00 UTC Cimaron makes landfall on Himeji.
18:00 UTC at  the JMA downgrades Soulik to a tropical storm.
18:00 UTC at  the JMA downgrades Cimaron to a severe tropical storm.
18:00 UTC at  the JTWC downgrades Cimaron to a tropical storm.
August 24
06:00 UTC at  the JMA downgrades Cimaron to a tropical storm.
06:00 UTC at  the JMA begins tracking a tropical depression in the Philippine Sea.
12:00 UTC at  the JTWC assesses that Soulik has transitioned into an extratropical cyclone.
12:00 UTC at  the JMA assesses that Cimaron has transitioned into an extratropical cyclone.
12:00 UTC at  the JTWC assesses that Cimaron has transitioned into an extratropical cyclone.
12:00 UTC 24W exits the PAR.
18:00 UTC at  the JMA assesses that Soulik has transitioned into an extratropical cyclone over the Sea of Japan.
18:00 UTC Cimaron dissipates over the Sea of Japan.
August 25
00:00 UTC at  24W makes landfall on Fujian.
06:00 UTC at  the JTWC downgrades 24W to a tropical disturbance.
12:00 UTC at  the JMA estimates that the Philippine Sea tropical depression has peaked in intensity with a minimum central pressure of 1000 hPa (mbar; 29.53 inHg).
August 26
06:00 UTC at  the JMA stops tracking 24W.
06:00 UTC at  the JMA stops tracking the Philippine Sea tropical depression.
18:00 UTC at  the JMA begins tracking a tropical depression near the Marshall Islands.
August 27
06:00 UTC at  the JTWC begins tracking the Marshall Islands tropical depression, designating it 25W.
18:00 UTC at  the JMA upgrades 25W to a tropical storm, assigning it the name Jebi.
August 28
00:00 UTC at  the JTWC upgrades Jebi to a tropical storm.
18:00 UTC at  the JMA upgrades Jebi to a severe tropical storm.
August 29
06:00 UTC at  the JMA upgrades Jebi to a typhoon.
06:00 UTC at  the JTWC upgrades Jebi to a typhoon.
18:00 UTC at  the JTWC upgrades Jebi to a Category 2-equivalent typhoon on the SSHWS.
August 30
00:00 UTC at  the JTWC upgrades Jebi to a Category 3-equivalent typhoon on the SSHWS.
06:00 UTC at  Soulik exits the West Pacific basin.
12:00 UTC at  the JTWC upgrades Jebi to a Category 4-equivalent typhoon on the SSHWS.
18:00 UTC at  the JTWC upgrades Jebi to a super typhoon and to a Category 5-equivalent typhoon on the SSHWS.
August 31
00:00 UTC at  the JMA estimates that Jebi has peaked in intensity with maximum sustained winds of 195 km/h (120 mph) and a minimum central pressure of 915 hPa (mbar; 27.02 inHg).
06:00 UTC at  the JTWC estimates that Jebi has peaked in intensity with maximum 1-minute sustained winds of 285 km/h (180 mph).

September
September 1
12:00 UTC at  the JTWC downgrades Jebi to a Category 4-equivalent typhoon on the SSHWS.
18:00 UTC at  the JTWC downgrades Jebi to a typhoon.
September 2
08:00 UTC at  Jebi enters the PAR, prompting the PAGASA to assign it the local name Maymay.
21:00 UTC at  Jebi exits the PAR.
September 3
00:00 UTC at  the JTWC downgrades Jebi to a Category 3-equivalent typhoon on the SSHWS.
September 4
03:00 UTC Jebi makes its first landfall on Tokushima Prefecture.
05:00 UTC Jebi makes its second and final landfall on Kobe.
06:00 UTC at  the JTWC downgrades Jebi to a Category 1-equivalent typhoon on the SSHWS.
12:00 UTC at  the JTWC assesses that Jebi has transitioned into an extratropical cyclone.
15:00 UTC at  the JMA downgrades Jebi to a severe tropical storm.
September 5
00:00 UTC at  the JMA assesses that Jebi has transitioned into an extratropical cyclone off the Primorsky Krai coast.
00:00 UTC at  the JMA begins tracking a tropical depression in the Philippine Sea.
September 6
00:00 UTC at  the JMA estimates that the Philippine Sea tropical depression has peaked in intensity, with maximum sustained winds of 55 km/h (35 mph) and a minimum central pressure of 1004 hPa (mbar; 29.65 inHg).
12:00 UTC at  the JMA begins tracking a tropical depression near the Marshall Islands.
September 7
06:00 UTC at  Jebi crosses the 60th parallel north.
06:00 UTC at  the JTWC begins tracking the Marshall Islands tropical depression, designating it 26W.
12:00 UTC at  the JMA upgrades 26W to a tropical storm, assigning it the name Mangkhut.
18:00 UTC at  the JTWC upgrades Mangkhut to a tropical storm.
September 8
00:00 UTC at  the JMA stops tracking the Philippine Sea tropical depression.
06:00 UTC at  the JMA begins tracking a tropical depression in the Luzon Strait.
18:00 UTC at  the JMA upgrades Mangkhut to a severe tropical storm.
September 9
00:00 UTC at  the JMA upgrades Mangkhut to a typhoon.
00:00 UTC at  the JTWC upgrades Mangkhut to a typhoon.
12:00 UTC at  the JTWC begins tracking the Luzon Strait tropical depression, designating it 27W.
September 10
00:00 UTC at  the JTWC upgrades Mangkhut to a Category 2-equivalent typhoon on the SSHWS.
03:00 UTC the PAGASA upgrades 27W to a tropical depression, assigning it the local name Neneng.
06:00 UTC at  the JTWC upgrades 27W to a tropical storm.
12:00 UTC at  the JTWC upgrades Mangkhut to a Category 3-equivalent typhoon on the SSHWS.
21:00 UTC 27W exits the PAR.
September 11
00:00 UTC at  the JTWC upgrades Mangkhut to a Category 4-equivalent typhoon on the SSHWS.
00:00 UTC at  the JMA upgrades 27W to a tropical storm, assigning it the name Barijat.
06:00 UTC at  the JTWC upgrades Mangkhut to a super typhoon and to a Category 5-equivalent typhoon on the SSHWS.
06:00 UTC at  the JMA estimates that Barijat has peaked in intensity with maximum sustained winds of 75 km/h (45 mph) and a minimum central pressure of 998 hPa (mbar; 29.47 inHg).
06:00 UTC at  the JTWC estimates that Barijat has peaked in intensity with maximum 1-minute sustained winds of 85 km/h (50 mph).
12:00 UTC at  the JMA estimates that Mangkhut has peaked in intensity with maximum sustained winds of 205 km/h (125 mph) and a minimum central pressure of 905 hPa (mbar; 26.72 inHg).
September 12
06:00 UTC at  the JTWC estimates that Mangkhut has peaked in intensity with maximum 1-minute sustained winds of 285 km/h (180 mph).
07:00 UTC Mangkhut enters the PAR, prompting the PAGASA to assign it the local name Ompong.
September 13
00:30 UTC Barijat makes landfall on Zhanjiang.
06:00 UTC at  the JMA downgrades Barijat to a tropical depression.
06:00 UTC at  the JTWC downgrades Barijat to a tropical depression.
12:00 UTC Barijat dissipates over Southern China.
12:00 UTC at  the JTWC downgrades Barijat to a tropical disturbance.
September 14
17:30 UTC Mangkhut makes its first landfall on Baggao.
September 15
00:00 UTC at  the JTWC downgrades Mangkhut to a typhoon and to a Category 4-equivalent typhoon on the SSHWS.
06:00 UTC at  the JTWC downgrades Mangkhut to a Category 3-equivalent typhoon on the SSHWS.
12:00 UTC at  the JTWC downgrades Mangkhut to a Category 2-equivalent typhoon on the SSHWS.
13:00 UTC Mangkhut exits the PAR.
September 16
00:00 UTC at  the JTWC downgrades Mangkhut to a Category 1-equivalent typhoon on the SSHWS.
09:00 UTC Mangkhut makes its second and final landfall on Taishan, Guangdong.
18:00 UTC at  the JMA downgrades Mangkhut to a severe tropical storm.
September 17
00:00 UTC at  the JMA downgrades Mangkhut to a tropical storm.
06:00 UTC at  the JMA downgrades Mangkhut to a tropical depression.
06:00 UTC at  the JTWC downgrades Mangkhut to a tropical depression.
12:00 UTC at  the JTWC downgrades Mangkhut to a tropical disturbance.
September 18
00:00 UTC Mangkhut dissipates over Southern China.
September 20
06:00 UTC at  the JMA begins tracking a tropical depression near the Mariana Islands.
18:00 UTC at  the JTWC begins monitoring the Mariana Islands tropical depression, designating it 28W.
September 21
06:00 UTC at  the JMA upgrades 28W to a tropical storm, assigning it the name Trami.
06:00 UTC at  the JTWC upgrades Trami to a tropical storm.
12:00 UTC at  the JMA begins tracking a tropical depression that formed from the remnants of Hurricane Olivia near the International Date Line.
September 22
00:00 UTC at  the JMA upgrades Trami to a severe tropical storm.
18:00 UTC at  the JMA upgrades Trami to a typhoon.
18:00 UTC at  the JTWC upgrades Trami to a typhoon.
September 23
02:30 UTC Trami enters the PAR, prompting the PAGASA to assign it the local name Paeng.
06:00 UTC the International Date Line tropical depression dissipates.
06:00 UTC at  the JTWC upgrades Trami to a Category 3-equivalent typhoon on the SSHWS.
12:00 UTC at  the JTWC upgrades Trami to a Category 4-equivalent typhoon on the SSHWS.
September 24
06:00 UTC at  the JTWC upgrades Trami to a super typhoon.
18:00 UTC at  the JMA estimates that Trami has peaked in intensity with maximum sustained winds of 195 km/h (120 mph) and a minimum central pressure of 915 hPa (mbar; 27.02 inHg).
18:00 UTC at  the JTWC upgrades Trami to a Category 5-equivalent typhoon on the SSHWS, estimating maximum 1-minute sustained winds of 260 km/h (160 mph).
September 25
00:00 UTC at  the JTWC downgrades Trami to a Category 4-equivalent typhoon on the SSHWS.
06:00 UTC at  the JMA begins tracking a tropical depression.
12:00 UTC at  the JTWC downgrades Trami to a typhoon.
18:00 UTC at  the JTWC downgrades Trami to a Category 3-equivalent typhoon on the SSHWS.
September 26
00:00 UTC at  the JMA estimates that the tropical depression has peaked in intensity with maximum sustained winds of 55 km/h (35  mph and a minimum central pressure of 1008 hPa (mbar; 29.77 inHg).
00:00 UTC at  the JTWC begins tracking the tropical depression, designating it 29W.
06:00 UTC at  the JTWC downgrades Trami to a Category 2-equivalent typhoon on the SSHWS.
September 27
12:00 UTC at  the JMA stops tracking 29W.
12:00 UTC at  the JTWC assesses that 29W has transitioned into an extratropical cyclone.
18:00 UTC at  the JTWC stops tracking 29W.
22:00 UTC Trami exits the PAR.
September 28
00:00 UTC at  the JMA begins tracking a tropical depression west of Chuuk Lagoon.
00:00 UTC at  the JTWC begins tracking the tropical depression, designating it 30W.
12:00 UTC at  the JTWC upgrades 30W to a tropical storm.
September 29
06:00 UTC at  the JMA upgrades 30W to a tropical storm, assigning it the name Kong-rey.
18:00 UTC at  the JMA upgrades Kong-rey to a severe tropical storm.
18:00 UTC at  the JTWC upgrades Kong-rey to a typhoon.
September 30
00:00 UTC at  the JTWC downgrades Trami to a Category 1-equivalent typhoon on the SSHWS.
06:00 UTC at  the JMA upgrades Kong-rey to a typhoon.
11:00 UTC Trami makes landfall near Tanabe, Wakayama.
12:00 UTC at  the JTWC assesses that Trami has transitioned into an extratropical cyclone.
12:00 UTC at  the JTWC upgrades Kong-rey to a Category 2-equivalent typhoon on the SSHWS.

October
October 1
00:00 UTC at  the JMA assesses that Trami has transitioned into an extratropical cyclone.
00:00 UTC at  the JTWC upgrades Kong-rey to a Category 3-equivalent typhoon on the SSHWS.
06:00 UTC at  the JTWC upgrades Kong-rey to a Category 4-equivalent typhoon on the SSHWS.
09:00 UTC Kong-rey enters the PAR, prompting the PAGASA to assign it the local name Queenie.
12:00 UTC at  the JMA estimates that Kong-rey has peaked in intensity with maximum sustained winds of 215 km/h (130 mph) and a minimum central pressure of 900 hPa (mbar; 26.58 inHg).
12:00 UTC at  the JTWC upgrades Kong-rey to a super typhoon.
18:00 UTC at  the JTWC upgrades Kong-rey to a Category 5-equivalent typhoon on the SSHWS, estimating maximum sustained winds of 280 km/h (175 mph).
October 2
12:00 UTC at  the JTWC downgrades Kong-rey to a Category 4-equivalent typhoon on the SSHWS.
18:00 UTC at  the JTWC downgrades Kong-rey to a typhoon.
October 3
00:00 UTC at  the JTWC downgrades Kong-rey to a Category 3-equivalent typhoon on the SSHWS.
06:00 UTC at  the JTWC downgrades Kong-rey to a Category 2-equivalent typhoon on the SSHWS.
18:00 UTC at  Trami exits the West Pacific basin.
06:00 UTC at  the JTWC downgrades Kong-rey to a Category 1-equivalent typhoon on the SSHWS.
October 4
06:00 UTC at  the JMA downgrades Kong-rey to a severe tropical storm.
11:00 UTC Kong-rey exits the PAR.
October 5
00:00 UTC at  the JTWC downgrades Kong-rey to a tropical storm.
06:00 UTC at  the JMA upgrades Kong-rey to a typhoon.
12:00 UTC at  the JTWC upgrades Kong-rey to a typhoon.
October 6
00:00 UTC at  the JMA downgrades Kong-rey to a severe tropical storm.
00:50 UTC Kong-rey makes landfall on Tongyeong.
12:00 UTC at  the JMA assesses that Kong-rey has transitioned into an extratropical cyclone.
12:00 UTC at  the JTWC assesses that Kong-rey has transitioned into an extratropical cyclone.
October 7
18:00 UTC Kong-rey dissipates.
October 19
00:00 UTC at  the JMA begins tracking a tropical depression in the South China Sea, estimating a minimum central pressure of 1008 hPa (mbar; 29.77 inHg).
October 20
06:00 UTC at  the JMA stops tracking the South China Sea tropical depression.
18:00 UTC at  the JMA begins tracking a tropical depression near the Marshall Islands.
October 21
12:00 UTC at  the JTWC begins tracking the Marshall Islands tropical depression, designating it 31W.
October 22
00:00 UTC at  the JMA upgrades 31W to a tropical storm, assigning it the name Yutu.
00:00 UTC at  the JTWC upgrades Yutu to a tropical storm.
18:00 UTC at  the JMA upgrades Yutu to a severe tropical storm.
October 23
00:00 UTC at  the JMA upgrades Yutu to a typhoon.
00:00 UTC at  the JTWC upgrades Yutu to a typhoon.
12:00 UTC at  the JTWC upgrades Yutu to a Category 2-equivalent typhoon on the SSHWS.
18:00 UTC at  the JTWC upgrades Yutu to a Category 3-equivalent typhoon on the SSHWS.
October 24
00:00 UTC at  the JTWC upgrades Yutu to a super typhoon and to a Category 4-equivalent typhoon on the SSHWS.
06:00 UTC at  the JTWC upgrades Yutu to a Category 5-equivalent typhoon on the SSHWS.
12:00 UTC at  the JMA estimates that Yutu has peaked in intensity with maximum sustained winds of 215 km/h (130 mph) and a minimum central pressure of 900 hPa (mbar; 26.58 inHg).
16:00 UTC Yutu makes landfall on Tinian.
18:00 UTC at  the JTWC estimates that Yutu has peaked in intensity with maximum 1-minute sustained winds of 280 km/h (175 mph).
October 25
18:00 UTC at  the JTWC downgrades Yutu to a Category 4-equivalent typhoon on the SSHWS.
October 26
06:00 UTC at  the JTWC upgrades Yutu to a Category 5-equivalent typhoon on the SSHWS.
22:30 UTC Yutu enters the PAR, prompting the PAGASA to assign it the local name Rosita.
October 27
18:00 UTC at  the JTWC downgrades Yutu to a Category 4-equivalent typhoon on the SSHWS.
October 28
12:00 UTC at  the JTWC downgrades Yutu to a typhoon.
18:00 UTC at  the JTWC downgrades Yutu to a Category 3-equivalent typhoon on the SSHWS.
October 29
12:00 UTC at  the JTWC upgrades Yutu to a Category 4-equivalent typhoon on the SSHWS.
18:00 UTC at  the JTWC downgrades Yutu to a Category 3-equivalent typhoon on the SSHWS.
20:00 UTC Yutu makes landfall on Dinapigue.
October 30
00:00 UTC at  the JTWC downgrades Yutu to a Category 2-equivalent typhoon on the SSHWS.
06:00 UTC at  the JMA downgrades Yutu to a severe tropical storm.
06:00 UTC at  the JTWC downgrades Yutu to a Category 1-equivalent typhoon on the SSHWS.
18:00 UTC at  the JTWC downgrades Yutu to a tropical storm.
October 31
06:00 UTC at  the JMA downgrades Yutu to a tropical storm.
06:00 UTC Yutu exits the PAR.

November
November 2
06:00 UTC at  the JMA downgrades Yutu to a tropical depression.
12:00 UTC at  the JTWC downgrades Yutu to a tropical depression.
18:00 UTC at  the JTWC downgrades Yutu to a tropical disturbance.
November 3
06:00 UTC Yutu dissipates over the South China Sea.
November 13
00:00 UTC at  the JMA begins tracking a tropical depression near the Marshall Islands.
November 16
18:00 UTC at  the JMA begins tracking a tropical depression in the South China sea.
November 17
00:00 UTC at  the JTWC begins tracking the South China Sea tropical depression, designating it 32W.
06:00 UTC at  the JMA upgrades 32W to a tropical storm, assigning it the name Toraji and estimating maximum sustained winds of 65 km/h (40 mph) and a minimum central pressure of 1004 hPa (mbar; 29.65 inHg).
12:00 UTC at  the JTWC begins tracking the Marshall Islands tropical depression, designating it 33W.
12:00 UTC at  the JTWC estimates that Toraji has peaked in intensity with maximum 1-minute sustained winds of 55 km/h (35 mph).
November 18
00:00 UTC at  the JMA downgrades Toraji to a tropical depression.
02:00 UTC 33W enters the PAR, prompting the PAGASA to assign it the local name Samuel.
12:00 UTC at  the JTWC downgrades Toraji to a tropical disturbance.
18:00 UTC the JMA assesses that Toraji has dissipated over Vietnam.
November 20
00:00 UTC at  the JTWC upgrades Toraji to a tropical depression.
12:00 UTC at  the JMA begins tracking a tropical depression near Chuuk State.
12:00 UTC at  the JTWC begins tracking the Chuuk State tropical depression, designating it 34W.
18:00 UTC at  the JTWC downgrades 33W to a tropical disturbance.
18:00 UTC 33W makes its first landfall on Borongan.
18:00 UTC at  the JMA upgrades 34W to a tropical storm, assigning it the name Man-yi.
18:00 UTC at  the JTWC upgrades Man-yi to a tropical storm.
20:00 UTC 33W makes its second landfall on Daram, Samar.
21:00 UTC 33W makes its third landfall on Caibiran.
21:30 UTC 33W makes its fourth landfall on Calubian.
November 21
00:00 UTC at  the JTWC downgrades Toraji to a tropical disturbance over the Malay Peninsula.
01:00 UTC 33W makes its fifth landfall on Barotac Nuevo.
06:00 UTC the JTWC assesses that Toraji has dissipated.
12:00 UTC at  the JTWC upgrades 33W to a tropical depression.
17:00 UTC 33W makes its sixth landfall on Roxas, Palawan.
18:00 UTC at  the JTWC upgrades Man-yi to a typhoon.
November 22
00:00 UTC at  the JMA upgrades 33W to a tropical storm, assigning it the name Usagi.
00:00 UTC at  the JTWC upgrades Usagi to a tropical storm.
00:00 UTC at  the JMA upgrades Man-yi to a severe tropical storm.
06:00 UTC at  the JTWC upgrades Man-yi to a Category 2-equivalent typhoon on the SSHWS.
10:00 UTC Usagi leaves the PAR.
12:00 UTC at  the JMA upgrades Man-yi to a typhoon.
November 23
06:00 UTC at  the JMA upgrades Usagi to a severe tropical storm.
12:00 UTC at  the JTWC upgrades Usagi to a typhoon.
12:00 UTC Man-yi enters the PAR, prompting the PAGASA to assign it the local name Tomas.
November 24
00:00 UTC at  the JMA estimates that Usagi has peaked in intensity with maximum sustained winds of 110 km/h (70 mph) and a minimum central pressure of 990 hPa (mbar; 29.23 inHg).
00:00 UTC at  the JTWC upgrades Usagi to a Category 2-equivalent typhoon on the SSHWS, estimating maximum sustained winds of 165 km/h (105 mph).
02:00 UTC Man-yi exits the PAR.
06:00 UTC at  the JTWC downgrades Man-yi to a Category 1-equivalent typhoon on the SSHWS.
12:00 UTC at  the JTWC downgrades Usagi to a Category 1-equivalent typhoon on the SSHWS.
12:00 UTC at  the JMA estimates that Man-yi has peaked in intensity with maximum sustained winds of 150 km/h (90 mph) and a minimum central pressure of 960 hPa (mbar; 28.35 inHg).
18:00 UTC at  the JTWC upgrades Man-yi to a Category 2-equivalent typhoon on the SSHWS.
November 25
00:00 UTC at  the JMA downgrades Usagi to a severe tropical storm.
00:00 UTC at  the JTWC downgrades Usagi to a tropical storm.
00:00 UTC at  the JTWC estimates that Man-yi has peaked in intensity with maximum 1-minute sustained winds of 175 km/h (110 mph).
12:00 UTC at  Usagi makes its seventh and final landfall just east of Ho Chi Minh City.
12:00 UTC at  the JTWC downgrades Man-yi to a Category 1-equivalent typhoon on the SSHWS.
18:00 UTC at  the JTWC downgrades Usagi to a tropical depression.
18:00 UTC at  the JMA downgrades Man-yi to a severe tropical storm.
20:00 UTC Man-yi enters the PAR.
November 26
00:00 UTC at  the JMA downgrades Usagi to a tropical depression.
00:00 UTC at  the JMA downgrades Man-yi to a tropical storm.
00:00 UTC at  the JTWC downgrades Man-yi to a tropical storm.
12:00 UTC at  the JTWC downgrades Usagi to a tropical disturbance.
12:00 UTC at  the JMA downgrades Man-yi to a tropical depression.
12:00 UTC at  the JTWC downgrades Man-yi to a tropical depression.
18:00 UTC at  the PAGASA stops tracking Man-yi.
November 27
00:00 UTC Usagi dissipates over Cambodia.
00:00 UTC at  the JMA upgrades Man-yi to a tropical storm.
06:00 UTC at  the JMA downgrades Man-yi to a tropical depression.
18:00 UTC at  the JTWC assesses that Man-yi has transitioned into an extratropical cyclone.
November 28
06:00 UTC at  the JMA assesses that Man-yi has transitioned into an extratropical cyclone.
November 30
12:00 UTC Man-yi crosses the International Date Line.

December
December 25
06:00 UTC at  the JMA begins tracking a tropical depression in the Philippine Sea.
07:00 UTC the Philippine Sea tropical depression enters the PAR, prompting the PAGASA to assign it the local name Usman.
December 27
06:00 UTC at  the JTWC begins tracking the Philippine Sea tropical depression, designating it 35W.
18:00 UTC at  the JMA estimates that 35W has peaked in intensity with maximum sustained winds of 55 km/h (35 mph) and a minimum central pressure of 1000 hPa (mbar; 29.53 inHg).
December 28
12:00 UTC at  the JTWC downgrades 35W to a low-pressure area.
21:00 UTC the PAGASA stops tracking 35W.
22:00 UTC 35W makes landfall on Borongan.
December 29
15:00 UTC the JMA stops tracking 35W.
December 31
06:00 UTC at  the JMA begins tracking a tropical depression in the South China Sea.
06:00 UTC at  the JTWC begins tracking the South China Sea tropical depression, designating it 36W.

Notes

References

2018 Pacific typhoon season